(Saint Mary of Egypt) is an opera in one act, in three episodes, by the Italian composer Ottorino Respighi. The libretto, by Claudio Guastalla, is based on a Medieval life of Saint Mary of Egypt, contained in the translation into the vernacular of the Vitae Patrum written by Domenico Cavalca.

The work was originally intended as a concert piece although it has been fully staged in some revivals. It was first performed at Carnegie Hall, New York City, on 16 March 1932. The first stage performance was at the Teatro Goldoni in Venice on 10 August 1932. Both the language of the libretto and the music employ archaism; Respighi's score contains stylistic echoes of Gregorian chant, Renaissance music and Monteverdi.

Roles

Instrumentation
Maria egiziaca is scored for the following instruments:

flute , oboe, 2 clarinets, bassoon, 2 horns, trumpet, 2 trombones, harpsichord (or piano), strings.

Synopsis
The prostitute Mary suddenly feels an overwhelming longing to travel to Jerusalem. Here she repents her sins and an angel tells her to go to the desert where she lives in prayer until old age. She is found dying by Saint Zosimas, who digs her grave with the help of a lion.

Recordings

References

Further reading
Del Teatro 
Waterhouse, John C. G., "Maria egiziaca", in Holden, Amanda (ed.) (2001), The New Penguin Opera Guide, New York: Penguin Putnam. p. 742. 

Operas by Ottorino Respighi
Italian-language operas
1932 operas
One-act operas
Operas
Operas set in Egypt
Operas set in the 5th century
Cultural depictions of Egyptian women
Operas based on actual events
Operas based on real people